The Battle of the Gulf of Almería, also known as the Battle of Almería Bay or the Battle of Cape of Palos, was a naval Spanish victory that took place in late August, 1591, off Almería, near the Cape Palos, during the Eighty Years' War and the Anglo–Spanish War (1585–1604). The battle occurred when the Spanish fleet of the Adelantado of Castile, Don Martín de Padilla y Manrique, Count of Santa Gadea (in their return from the Republic of Venice to Spain with a valuable goods), sighted an Anglo-Dutch fleet in the waters of Almería, on the southern coast of Spain. The Spanish fleet, led by Martín de Padilla, attacked with such fury the Anglo-Dutch fleet who managed to undo their training, achieved a great success. About 20 Dutch ships and 3 English ships were captured by the Spaniards, and some ships of the rest of the Anglo-Dutch fleet were seriously damaged. On the other hand, the Spanish losses were minimal.

After the battle, the Spanish fleet victorious, entered the port of Almeria with the captured ships.

See also
 Cape Palos
 Siege of Deventer (1591)
 Battle of Flores (1591)
 Siege of Rouen (1591)
 Battle of the Bay of Biscay (1592)
 Battle of the Gulf of Cadiz

Notes

References
 Fernández Duro, Cesáreo (1898). Armada Española desde la unión de los reinos de Castilla y Aragón. Vol. III. Instituto de Historia y Cultura Naval. Madrid. 
 VV.AA. Enciclopedia General del Mar. Garriga. (1957).
 Rodríguez González, Agustín Ramón. Victorias por Mar de los Españoles. Grafite Ediciones (2006).  
 MacCaffrey, Wallace T. (1994). Elizabeth I: War and Politics, 1588-1603. Princeton. Princeton University Press. USA.

External links
 Fernández Duro, Cesáreo (1898). Armada Española desde la unión de los reinos de Castilla y Aragón. Vol. III. Instituto de Historia y Cultura Naval. Madrid. 
 Biografía de Don Martín Manrique de Lara y Padilla, Adelantado Mayor de Castilla 

Naval battles of the Eighty Years' War
Naval battles of the Anglo-Spanish War (1585–1604)
Conflicts in 1591
Naval battles involving Spain
Naval battles involving the Dutch Republic
Naval battles involving England
1591 in Europe
1591 in the British Empire
1591 in Spain
Eighty Years' War (1566–1609)